In mathematics, a regulated function, or ruled function, is a certain kind of well-behaved function of a single real variable. Regulated functions arise as a class of integrable functions, and have several equivalent characterisations.  Regulated functions were introduced by Nicolas Bourbaki in 1949, in their book "Livre IV: Fonctions d'une variable réelle".

Definition

Let X be a Banach space with norm || - ||X. A function f : [0, T] → X is said to be a regulated function if one (and hence both) of the following two equivalent conditions holds true:

 for every t in the interval [0, T], both the left and right limits f(t−) and f(t+) exist in X (apart from, obviously, f(0−) and f(T+));
 there exists a sequence of step functions φn : [0, T] → X converging uniformly to f (i.e. with respect to the supremum norm || - ||∞).

It requires a little work to show that these two conditions are equivalent. However, it is relatively easy to see that the second condition may be re-stated in the following equivalent ways:

 for every δ > 0, there is some step function φδ : [0, T] → X such that

 f lies in the closure of the space Step([0, T]; X) of all step functions from [0, T] into X (taking closure with respect to the supremum norm in the space B([0, T]; X) of all bounded functions from [0, T] into X).

Properties of regulated functions

Let Reg([0, T]; X) denote the set of all regulated functions f : [0, T] → X.

 Sums and scalar multiples of regulated functions are again regulated functions.  In other words, Reg([0, T]; X) is a vector space over the same field K as the space X; typically, K will be the real or complex numbers.  If X is equipped with an operation of multiplication, then products of regulated functions are again regulated functions.  In other words, if X is a K-algebra, then so is Reg([0, T]; X).
 The supremum norm is a norm on Reg([0, T]; X), and Reg([0, T]; X) is a topological vector space with respect to the topology induced by the supremum norm.
 As noted above, Reg([0, T]; X) is the closure in B([0, T]; X) of Step([0, T]; X) with respect to the supremum norm.
 If X is a Banach space, then Reg([0, T]; X) is also a Banach space with respect to the supremum norm.
 Reg([0, T]; R) forms an infinite-dimensional real Banach algebra: finite linear combinations and products of regulated functions are again regulated functions.
 Since a continuous function defined on a compact space (such as [0, T]) is automatically uniformly continuous, every continuous function f : [0, T] → X is also regulated. In fact, with respect to the supremum norm, the space C0([0, T]; X) of continuous functions is a closed linear subspace of Reg([0, T]; X).
 If X is a Banach space, then the space BV([0, T]; X) of functions of bounded variation forms a dense linear subspace of Reg([0, T]; X):

 If X is a Banach space, then a function f : [0, T] → X is regulated if and only if it is of bounded φ-variation for some φ:

 If X is a separable Hilbert space, then Reg([0, T]; X) satisfies a compactness theorem known as the Fraňková–Helly selection theorem.
 The set of discontinuities of a regulated function of bounded variation BV is countable for such functions have only jump-type of discontinuities. In particular, the discontinuity set has measure zero, from which it follows that a regulated function has a well-defined Riemann integral.
 Remark: By the Baire Category theorem  the set of points of discontinuity of such function  is either meager or else has nonempty interior. This is not always equivalent with countability.

 The integral, as defined on step functions in the obvious way, extends naturally to Reg([0, T]; X) by defining the integral of a regulated function to be the limit of the integrals of any sequence of step functions converging uniformly to it. This extension is well-defined and satisfies all of the usual properties of an integral. In particular, the regulated integral
 is a bounded linear function from Reg([0, T]; X) to X; hence, in the case X = R, the integral is an element of the space that is dual to Reg([0, T]; R);
 agrees with the Riemann integral.

References

External links

Real analysis
Types of functions